Kandukur is a village in Ranga Reddy district of the Indian state of Telangana. It is located in Kandukur mandal of Kandukur revenue division.

Geography 
Kandukur is a suburban village and mandal headquarters located on the outskirts of Hyderabad, India. It comes under Ranga Reddy district of Telangana.

Mandal 
The following is the list of villages panchayats in Kandukur Mandal.

Kothaguda
Jaithwaram
Pulimamidi
Muralinagar
Bachupally
Nedunoor
Manneguda
DasarlaPally
Mucherla
Sarlapally
Saireddyguda (సాయిరెడ్డిగూడ)
Debbadaguda
Meerkhanpet
Begarikancha
Akulamailaram
Thimmaipally
Gudur
Kothur
Rachuloor
Begumpet
Thimmapur
Jabbarguda
Gummadavelli
Madhapur
Lemoor
Agarmiyaguda
Saraswathigudem

References 

Villages in Ranga Reddy district